Mala Sakonhninhom (born February 4, 1965) is a Laotian sprinter. She competed in the women's 100 metres race at the 1988 Summer Olympics.

References

External links
 

1965 births
Living people
Laotian female sprinters
Olympic athletes of Laos
Athletes (track and field) at the 1988 Summer Olympics
Olympic female sprinters